Transistor testers are instruments for testing the electrical behavior of transistors and solid-state diodes.

Types of tester

There are three types of transistor testers each performing a unique operation.

 Quick-check in-circuit checker
 Service type tester
 Laboratory-standard tester

In addition, curve tracers are reliable indicators of transistor performance.

Circuit Tester 

A circuit tester is used to check whether a transistor which has previously been performing properly in a circuit is still operational. The transistor's ability to "amplify" is taken as a rough index of its performance. This type of tester indicates to a technician whether the transistor is dead or still operative. The advantage of this tester is that the transistor does not have to be removed from the circuit.

Service type transistor testers
These devices usually perform three types of checks:
Forward-current gain, or beta of transistor.
Base-to-collector leakage current with emitter open(ico)
Short circuits from collector to emitter and base.

Some service testers include a go/no-go feature, indicating a pass when a certain hfe is exceeded. These are useful, but fail some functional but low hfe transistors.

Some also provide a means of identifying transistor elements, if these are unknown. The tester has all these features and can check solid-state devices in and out of circuit. 

Transistor hfe varies fairly widely with Ic, so measurements with the service type tester give readings that can differ quite a bit from the hfe in the transistor's real life application. Hence these testers are useful, but can't be regarded as giving accurate real-life hfe values.

Laboratory-standard transistor tester or Analyser 

This type of tester is used for measuring transistor parameters dynamically under various operating conditions. The readings they give are absolute. Among the important characteristics measured are:

Icbo collector current with emitter open (Common base)
ac beta (Common emitter)
Rin (Input resistance)

Transistor testers have the necessary controls and switches for making the proper voltage, current and signal settings. A meter with a calibrated "good" and "bad" scale is on the front.
In addition, these transistor testers are designed to check the solid-state diodes. There are also testers for checking high transistor and rectifiers.

See also
 Load pull, a colloquial term applied to the process of systematically varying the impedance presented to a device under test

References

Transistors
Electronic test equipment